Indian Institute of Mass Communication, Dhenkanal was established in August 1993 as a branch of IIMC, Delhi, an autonomous body funded by the Ministry of Information and Broadcasting, India. It offers Post Graduate Diploma journalism courses in English and Odia, an official Indian language spoken mainly in Odisha.

Location
The institute is located in the Dhenkanal district of Odisha, approximately 80 km away from Bhubaneswar, the state's capital. Dhenkanal was a former princely state in British India, which merged into India after independence in 1947. It became a part of the East Indian state of Odisha in 1948.

Institution
It is one of the six branches of Indian Institute of Mass Communication and the oldest(1993) after IIMC New Delhi(1965). The institute, known for its media studies and research in Mass Communication, offers post graduate diploma courses in English and Odia Journalism. It also  conducts a number of specialized short-term courses and workshops to meet the training needs of media personnel working in the government and public sectors. Each year, the institute conducts an all-India entrance examination before selecting 68 students for its post graduate diploma course in English and 25 students for its Odia journalism course. It is connected by both rail and road (NH-55 connecting Cuttack and Sambalpur via Dhenkanal). The nearest bus stand is 500 metres away, nearest railway station is Dhenkanal railway station which is 5 kilometres from the campus. The nearest airport is Biju Pattnaik International Airport which is in Bhubaneswar (80 km).

The institute provides training, research and consultancy services for the central and state governments, public sector undertakings, universities as well as foreign institutions and international agencies. In the past, the institute has conducted assessment studies for the State AIDS cell and for the Ministry of Tribal Affairs on non-governmental organizations working for tribal communities.

The IIMC has often been ranked as one of the best colleges in India.

Infrastructure
The 7.5 acre campus is situated on the valley of Paniohala (meaning Hanging Water in Odia) hill which commands a majestic view. The eco-friendly campus has a rainwater harvesting system in place. The institute has three buildings: Academic Block, Administrative Block and Auditorium Block.

Academic Block

Academic Block has classrooms for English and Odia Journalism. Besides that, it has Computer lab, Video lab for TV News, Audio lab for Radio news and Internet room. Mind Space is a conceptual place in the academic block where students have general discussion on their assignments and news preparation. The library is also a part of this block.

Library
Library has more than 5,000 books on different aspects of mass communication and allied subjects. Subjects such as print media, broadcasting, advertising, communication, communication research, public relations, radio and television, film and traditional media are adequately covered. The Library also stocks some books on the allied fields such as Economics, Political Science, International Relations, Sociology, Philosophy, History, Psychology, Biography, Hindi, English and Odia literature, Odia journalism and current affairs. Library also subscribes periodicals, magazines, news papers for the benefit of the students.

Administrative Block
The Head of the Institute and other officials work in this block. Conference Hall is also a part of this block.

Audio and Video Block
It is the most creative block as it consists of Spandan, the auditorium; Ankur, the development studies corner, Digital Library, Media Museum and a Reading Room. The Reading Room is full of weekly magazines and periodicals. It remains open on Saturdays for students. The most creative part of this block is Media Museum where many regional and national newspapers’ copies are kept for exhibition along with some old camera model, old radio and TV sets and computers.

Admission Procedure
Admission is done by a separate entrance test for English, Hindi and Odia, and for Advertisement and Public Relations, conducted by IIMC, New Delhi. The admission notification is generally issued in the month of February and the entrance exam is conducted in the month of May. Results are announced in a month time. The Institute functions from Monday to Friday except on central government holidays.

Academic Session
Institute starts its academic session in late July or early August. The PGDMC programme has two semesters - first one from August to December and the second one from January to April. First semester exams are held in December and second semester exams are held in the month of April. There are two semester breaks: the mid-semester break of one week during Durga Puja (Dussehera) and second break again for a week in December after first semester examination.

Health facilities
Institute has doctor on call facility. Besides, the doctor visits the campus every Tuesday for weekly check-up of students.

Internship and Placement
Since 1993, institute has produced more than 1000 media professionals within a short span of time of 20 years. Students of this institute are working successfully in mainstream and alternative media all over the world in print, television, radio and new media domain. The institute provides students with 4 weeks of internship programme in related media organizations i.e. English and Odia news organizations after the completion of the second semester examinations. Campus placement drives are also organized centrally in New Delhi after the completion of the course. The IIMC Dhenkanal organizes its own campus placement drive at the end of the second semester.

Hostel and Mess
Institute  provides hostel facility, both for boys and girls. It has 36 rooms in boys’ hostel, i.e. 'Brahmaputra' and 38 rooms in girls’ hostel, i.e. 'Mahanadi'. Both Brahmputra and Mahandi have guest rooms for parents. Parents are allowed to stay for not more than two days. A room is allotted to only two students. There is common hall-cum-room in both the hostels with television and indoor playing equipments like Carrom and Table Tennis. There are also some gym equipments for students.

Magazine
Institute's e-magazine "The IIMC Reporter" was published for the first time in the year 2009–10. After this, every year, the magazine is being published at the end of the session by the students.

Playground
Since the institution is located just adjacent to the forest and hills, there is no big playground. But there is a court for badminton.

Head
Currently, Dr. Mrinal Chatterjee is Professor and Head of the Institution. He is serving the institution since 1999.

Academic Officers

Dr. Mrinal Chaterjee, Professor & Regional Director

Dr. Jyoti Prakash Mohapatra, Assistant Professor

Subhankari Das, Chief Librarian & Warden, Mahanadi Women's Hostel

Jitendra Pati, Academic Co-ordinator

Badreenath Jena, Technical Co-ordinator

Soumya Ranjan Bihara, Academic Associate

Padmalochan Pradhan, Academic Assistant

Administrative Officer

Kedarnath Jena, Section Officer

References

External links
 IIMC, Dhenkanal official website

 www.iimc.gov.in

Journalism schools in India
Universities and colleges in Odisha
Ministry of Information and Broadcasting (India)
Dhenkanal district
Educational institutions established in 1993
1993 establishments in Orissa